Prem Singh Dhami was a Nepalese politician and minister, belonging to the Communist Party of Nepal (Unified Marxist-Leninist). He was elected to the parliament in 1994.

In April 1997 he was appointed by Prime Minister Sher Bahadur Deuba to head a 'Working Committee for the Study of Maoist Activities and Finding Solutions', in order to counter the influence of the Communist Party of Nepal (Maoist). The committee was also known as the 'Dhami Commission'.

References

Born in Darchula Mlikarjun VDC

Government ministers of Nepal
Communist Party of Nepal (Unified Marxist–Leninist) politicians
Living people
Year of birth missing (living people)
Nepal MPs 1994–1999
Members of the National Assembly (Nepal)
People of the Nepalese Civil War